Facco is an Italian surname. Notable people with the surname include:

Giacomo Facco (1676–1753), Italian Baroque violinist, conductor and composer
Mario Facco (born 1946), Italian footballer and manager

See also
Gianfranco Facco-Bonetti (born 1940), Italian diplomat

Italian-language surnames